Pene Taka Tuaia (died 3 July 1889) was a New Zealand warrior, military engineer and land protester. Of Māori descent, he identified with the Ngāi Te Rangi iwi. He was the engineer of the fortification known as the Gate Pa, at Pukehinahina.

References

Year of birth unknown
1889 deaths
New Zealand military personnel
New Zealand engineers
Ngāi Te Rangi people
19th-century New Zealand engineers
19th-century New Zealand military personnel